The Kerala Legislative Assembly, popularly known as the Niyamasabha (literally Hall of laws), is the law-making body of Kerala, one of the 28 States in India. The Assembly is formed by 140 elected representatives. Each elected member represents one of the 140 constituencies within the borders of Kerala and is referred to as  Member of Legislative Assembly (MLA).

List of constituencies

See also
 List of former constituencies of the Kerala Legislative Assembly

References 

 
Assembly constituencies
Kerala